The India Government Mint, Kolkata was first established in 1757, and was located in a building next to the Black Hole in the old fort – where the GPO (General Post Office) stands today. It was called the Calcutta Mint and used to produce coins with the mint name Murshidabad.

Second mint
The second Calcutta Mint was established with the modern machinery brought in 1790 from England. It was located at the site of Gillet Ship building Establishment, which had been taken over by the Stamp and Stationary Committee in 1833. The coins issued from this mint continued to bear mint name Murshidabad.

Third mint

In March 1824, the foundation of the third Calcutta Mint was laid on Strand Road and was opened for production from 1 August 1829. Until 1835, coins issued at this mint continued to be in the name of the Murshidabad Mint. The imposing frontage of the building of the third Mint was based on a design of the Temple of Athena in Athens, Greece, usually known as the Parthenon. The operative blocks were hidden out of view by the magnificent frontage.

This mint was named as "Old Silver Mint". The foundation for this mint was laid March 1824, and production began 1 August 1829.

In 1860, an annexe known as the "Copper Mint" was built to the north of the Silver Mint for the exclusive production of copper coins.

The silver and copper mints both used to function and produce coins of bronze, silver and gold. Both these mints were well equipped with the coining presses supplied by Boulton and Watt of Soho, Birmingham, England.

Apart from minting of coins another important function of the Kolkata Mint was the manufacturing of medals and decorations during the British regime. The production of medals continues to this day.

After the closure of this mint in 1952 the building fell into disrepair, after years of neglect. The Kolkata Municipal Corporation declared this building a heritage building. A proposal to restore this building and convert its vast spaces into a museum was put up, and on 10 July 2008 pre-qualification bids were received from eight developers. The project will be a public-private partnership between the Security Printing and Minting Corporation, under the finance ministry, owner of the mint, and the winning bidder.

Alipore Mint
In the late 1930s, foundation work for a new mint was completed at Taratala, close to Alipore and construction was to have completed by early 1942. However World War II brought all construction to a halt. It was completed in early 1950s.

The Alipore Mint was opened by Finance Minister of Government of India Shree C. D. Deshmukh on 19 March 1952. The full operation for the coinage and preparation of medals, decorations and badges started in Alipore Mint from this date. In addition to production of coins for domestic use also produces coins for other nations.

See also
 Indian rupee
 Indian coinage
 India Government Mint
 Mumbai Mint

References

External links
India Government Mint, Kolkata

1757 establishments in India
1803 establishments in India
Buildings and structures in Kolkata
Mints of India
New Alipore
Numismatics